In mathematics, especially homotopy theory, the homotopy fiber (sometimes called the mapping fiber)  is part of a construction that associates a fibration to an arbitrary continuous function of topological spaces . It acts as a homotopy theoretic kernel of a mapping of topological spaces due to the fact it yields a long exact sequence of homotopy groupsMoreover, the homotopy fiber can be found in other contexts, such as homological algebra, where the distinguished trianglegives a long exact sequence analogous to the long exact sequence of homotopy groups. There is a dual construction called the homotopy cofiber.

Construction 
The homotopy fiber has a simple description for a continuous map . If we replace  by a fibration, then the homotopy fiber is simply the fiber of the replacement fibration. We recall this construction of replacing a map by a fibration:

Then  deformation retracts to this subspace by contracting the paths.

As a homotopy limit 
Another way to construct the homotopy fiber of a map is to consider the homotopy limitpg 21 of the diagramthis is because computing the homotopy limit amounts to finding the pullback of the diagramwhere the vertical map is the source and target map of a path , soThis means the homotopy limit is in the collection of mapswhich is exactly the homotopy fiber as defined above.

Properties

Homotopy fiber of a fibration 
This will induce a morphism of their long exact sequences of homotopy groups, from which (by applying the Five Lemma, as is done in the Puppe sequence) one can see that the map  is  a weak equivalence. Thus the above given construction reproduces the same homotopy type if there already is one.

Duality with mapping cone 
The homotopy fiber is dual to the mapping cone, much as the mapping path space is dual to the mapping cylinder.

Examples

Loop space 
Given a topological space  and the inclusion of a pointthe homotopy fiber of this map is thenwhich is the loop space .

From a covering space 
Given a universal coveringthe homotopy fiber  has the propertywhich can be seen by looking at the long exact sequence of the homotopy groups for the fibration. This is analyzed further below by looking at the Whitehead tower.

Applications

Postnikov tower 
One main application of the homotopy fiber is in the construction of the Postnikov tower. For a (nice enough) topological space , we can construct a sequence of spaces  and maps  whereandNow, these maps  can be iteratively constructed using homotopy fibers. This is because we can take a maprepresenting a cohomology class inand construct the homotopy fiberIn addition, notice the homotopy fiber of  isshowing the homotopy fiber acts like a homotopy-theoretic kernel. Note this fact can be shown by looking at the long exact sequence for the fibration constructing the homotopy fiber.

Maps from the whitehead tower 
The dual notion of the Postnikov tower is the Whitehead tower which gives a sequence of spaces  and maps  wherehence . If we take the induced mapthe homotopy fiber of this map recovers the -th postnikov approximation  since the long exact sequence of the fibrationwe getwhich gives isomorphismsfor .

See also 
Homotopy cofiber
Quasi-fibration
Adams resolution

References

.

Algebraic topology
Homotopy theory